Bottomless Lakes State Park is a state park in the U.S. state of New Mexico, located along the Pecos River, about  southeast of Roswell. Established in 1933, it was the first state park in New Mexico.  It takes its name from nine small, deep lakes located along the eastern escarpment of the Pecos River valley.

Lakes
Most of the nine lakes are almost completely surrounded by cliffs,  with the notable exceptions being Lea Lake and Lazy Lagoon. Lea Lake has a large, sandy shoreline on the western side and tall cliffs on the eastern side. The cliffs around Lazy Lagoon have been completely eroded away by the Pecos River, and the lake sits in a former channel of the river.

Although it is a single lake, it is made up of three separate sinkholes. The surface of the Lazy Lagoon is nearly level with the surrounding salt flats, which makes it look very shallow.

Lea Lake is the only lake in which swimming is allowed. It has a beach and concession area that is popular in the summer.

Its name stems from the water's dark color, caused by the steep sides of the cenote and algae growth within the lake.

In pure geologic terms, Figure Eight Lake is two lakes separated by a thin strip of land. When the water is very high the strip of land is covered, and the two nearly circular lakes join and take the shape of a figure eight. Irrigation in the Pecos Valley has lowered the water table, so the two lakes of Figure Eight lake rarely join to form a single lake anymore.

The lakes are not fed by streams, and the evaporation rate of the lakes in the hot desert climate exceeds the rate at which rainwater refills them. The lakes are fed by underground water percolating through the rocks and into the lakes. The high evaporation rate produces brackish water in the lakes.

Seven of the lakes are protected, although in recent years the lakes have been contaminated by trash that has been thrown into the lakes by careless visitors. The ninth and southernmost lake, Dimmitt Lake, is not a part of the state park and is owned by the Fin and Feather Club, a local hunting and fishing club

Origin of the lakes 
The Bottomless Lakes  occur at the base of an escarpment formed by the gypsum-rich Seven Rivers Formation. Ground water in the underlying San Andres artisan aquifer rises along faults at the escarpment and dissolves the gypsum thereby creating sinkholes or cenotes.

Wildlife
Four endangered species can be found in the park—the Pecos pupfish, the Rainwater Killifish, the cricket frog, and the Eastern Barking Frog.

In the winter, Devil's Inkwell and Cottonwood Lake are both stocked with Rainbow Trout.

See also 
 List of sinkholes of the United States
The Blue Hole, a similar waterbody also in New Mexico

References

External links

Bottomless Lakes State Park

State parks of New Mexico
Parks in Chaves County, New Mexico
Protected areas established in 1933
1933 establishments in New Mexico
Sinkholes of the United States
Landforms of Chaves County, New Mexico
Landforms of New Mexico
Bodies of water of Chaves County, New Mexico
Lakes of New Mexico
Ramsar sites in the United States